Diné College is a public tribal land-grant college in Tsaile, Arizona, serving the  Navajo Nation. It offers associate degrees, bachelor's degrees, and academic certificates.

Campus

The main campus of Diné College is in Tsaile, a census-designated place in unincorporated Apache County, Arizona. There are also five branches of Diné College: two in Apache County, Arizona (Chinle and Window Rock), one in Coconino County, Arizona (Tuba City), one in McKinley County, New Mexico (Crownpoint) and one in San Juan County, New Mexico (Shiprock).

The main Tsaile campus includes eight fifteen-room dormitories housing about 150 students: each octagonally shaped unit has a fireplace in the center, and is described by the college as a "hooghan away from hogan"—a reference to the traditional Navajo hogan dwelling.

The residence life office is in Ch'ó (Spruce) Hall. Residence halls include:

Co-ed:
 Deestsiin (Pinyon) Hall
 K'ai' (Willow) Hall
 Ndíshchíí' (Pine) Hall
 Sáá' (Maple) Hall
 T'iisbéí (Aspen) Hall (Honors)

Female only:
 T'iisbáhí (Elm) Hall
 T'iistsoh (Cottonwood) Hall

Male only:
 Tséch'il (Oak) Hall

Family housing:
 Gad (Juniper) Hall

Hogan Faculty Housing is also on campus. Residents of family housing and faculty housing are zoned to the Chinle Unified School District. Tsaile Elementary School is in proximity to the university. All Chinle USD residents are assigned to Chinle High School.

Governance
The college is directed by an eight-member Board of Regents confirmed by the Government Services Committee of the Navajo Nation Council. The name Diné comes from the traditional name for the Navajo, meaning "the people."

History 
Diné College opened in 1968 as the Navajo Community College, the first college established by Native Americans for Native Americans. The College was chartered by the Navajo Nation in 1968. The Navajo Tribal Council appointed Guy Gorman, Yazzie Begay, Chester Yellowhair, Carl Todacheene, Wilson Skeet, Howard Gorman, Allen Yazzie, and Dillon Platero to be the first to serve on the college's Board of Regents. Robert Roessel served as the college's first president.

The college was originally located on the site of the Rough Rock Community School in Rough Rock on a temporary basis until a permanent site could be chosen and constructed. The Board of Regents selected three possible sites for the college, namely the Tsaile–Wheatfields area, Many Farms, and Ganado. After a Board-commissioned survey of possible sites for the college, the Tsaile–Wheatfields area was recommended because it had plenty of water available and has scenic forests and lakes. After the Board was guaranteed 1,000 acres for the campus, a residential area, and a shopping area, the Board officially chose the Tsaile–Wheatfields area in October 1968. The Board asked people to send in designs for the college's seal, and it chose the William Morgan's design of an arrowhead encircled by a rainbow god.

The college officially opened on January 20, 1968, with 40 members of the faculty. There were 340 students enrolled during its first semester, which was the limit of its capacity. More than 3,000 other applicants had to be turned away because of the lack of space. The college added 23 evening classes because there was so much more demand for evening classes than for daytime classes.

By 1973, 3,421 students in total had enrolled at Navaho Community College, but only 46 had graduated with associate's degrees during that time. There was little for the students to do outside of classes, and excessive drinking became a problem for some.

Students began taking classes at the college's permanent campus in Tsaile in October 1973, after delays in its construction. The campus was officially dedicated on May 14, 1974. Most of the campus' buildings were built in octagonal shapes, similar to the eight-sided traditional Navaajo hogan. The campus cost $12million to build. Some classes were taught in Shiprock and Fort Defiance.

Tommy Lewis became president in August 1992. During his tenure, the college's funding from the Bureau of Indian Affairs increased to almost $7.3million in 2000. The Navajo Language and Culture Curriculum became widely popular at the Tsaile campus after the program saw increases in class enrollment, thus allowing the Board of Regents to implement the program throughout the institution. In 1994, the college was designated a land-grant college alongside 31 other tribal colleges.

During the Summer of 1997, the administration changed the name of the college from Navajo Community College to Diné College in order to better to represent the school's function as an institution of learning for the Diné/Navajo people.

In 1998, Diné College bestowed its first bachelor's degrees under the Diné Teacher Education Program, accredited through a partnership with Arizona State University.

In 1998, the Diné College Library was rededicated as the Kinyaa'áanii Charlie Benally Memorial Library.

On May 21, 2011, the women's archery team made history by winning the United States college national championship in compound bow.  This is believed to be the first time a tribal college team has won a top-tier intercollegiate national championship event in any sport.

Academics 
 The Uranium Education Program at the Shiprock campus is an empowerment program for the Navajo centering on the study of radiation and environmental health issues arising from the aftermath of uranium mining/milling operations on the Navajo Nation, as well as other serious environmental issues.

Diné College offers bachelor's degrees in elementary education and tribal management.

Alumni
 Carmelita Little Turtle – Apache/Rarámuri photographer
 Nicco Montaño – professional Mixed Martial Artist, inaugural and current UFC Women's Flyweight Champion as of March 2020. First UFC Champion with Navajo descent.

See also
 Diné College Press

References

External links

 

Universities and colleges in Arizona
Education on the Navajo Nation
American Indian Higher Education Consortium
Education in San Juan County, New Mexico
Educational institutions established in 1968
Buildings and structures in Apache County, Arizona
Buildings and structures in Navajo County, Arizona
Buildings and structures in Coconino County, Arizona
Education in Apache County, Arizona
Education in Navajo County, Arizona
Education in Coconino County, Arizona
USCAA member institutions
1968 establishments in Arizona
Community colleges in New Mexico